Ladissa is a genus of ground spiders that was first described by Eugène Simon in 1907.

Species
 it contains four species in India and Africa:
Ladissa africana Simon, 1907 – Sierra Leone
Ladissa inda (Simon, 1897) (type) – India
Ladissa latecingulata Simon, 1907 – India
Ladissa semirufa Simon, 1907 – Benin

References

Araneomorphae genera
Gnaphosidae
Spiders of Africa
Spiders of the Indian subcontinent
Taxa named by Eugène Simon